Dipeptidyl peptidase-4 (DPP4), also known as adenosine deaminase complexing protein 2 or CD26 (cluster of differentiation 26) is a protein that, in humans, is encoded by the DPP4 gene. DPP4 is related to FAP, DPP8, and DPP9. The enzyme was discovered in 1966 by Hopsu-Havu and Glenner, and as a result of various studies on chemism, was called dipeptidyl peptidase IV [DP IV].

Function 
The protein encoded by the DPP4 gene is an enzyme expressed on the surface of most cell types and is associated with immune regulation, signal transduction, and apoptosis. It is a type II transmembrane glycoprotein, but a soluble form, which lacks the intracellular and transmembrane part, is present in blood plasma and various body fluids. DPP-4 is a serine exopeptidase that cleaves X-proline or X-alanine dipeptides from the N-terminus of polypeptides. Peptide bonds involving the cyclic amino acid proline cannot be cleaved by the majority of proteases and an N-terminal X-proline "shields" various biopeptides. Extracellular proline-specific proteases therefore play an important role in the regulation of these biopeptides.

DPP-4 is known to cleave a broad range of substrates including growth factors, chemokines, neuropeptides, and vasoactive peptides. The cleaved substrates lose their biological activity in the majority of cases, but in the case of the chemokine RANTES and neuropeptide Y, DPP-4 mediated cleavage leads to a shift in the receptor subtype binding.

DPP4 plays a major role in glucose metabolism. It is responsible for the degradation of incretins such as GLP-1. Furthermore, it appears to work as a suppressor in the development of some tumors.

DPP-4 also binds the enzyme adenosine deaminase specifically and with high affinity. The significance of this interaction has yet to be established.

Animal studies 

Animal studies suggest its pathogenetic role in development of fibrosis of various organs, such as liver and kidney.

Clinical significance 

CD26/DPPIV plays an important role in tumor biology, and is useful as a marker for various cancers, with its levels either on the cell surface or in the serum increased in some neoplasms and decreased in others.

A class of oral hypoglycemics called dipeptidyl peptidase-4 inhibitors works by inhibiting the action of this enzyme, thereby prolonging incretin effect in vivo.

Middle East respiratory syndrome coronavirus has been found to bind to DPP4.  It is found on the surface of cells in the airways (such as the lungs) and kidneys. Scientists may be able to use this to their advantage by blocking the virus's entry into the cell.

See also 
Development of dipeptidyl peptidase-4 inhibitors
Berberine

References

Further reading

External links 
 The MEROPS online database for peptidases and their inhibitors: S09.003
 
 

EC 3.4.14
Proteases